Santa Barbara (meaning ) is a coastal city in Santa Barbara County, California, of which it is also the county seat. Situated on a south-facing section of coastline, the longest such section on the West Coast of the United States, the city lies between the steeply rising Santa Ynez Mountains and the Pacific Ocean. Santa Barbara's climate is often described as Mediterranean, and the city has been dubbed "The American Riviera". According to the 2020 U.S. Census, the city's population was 88,665.

In addition to being a popular tourist and resort destination, the city has a diverse economy that includes a large service sector, education, technology, health care, finance, agriculture, manufacturing, and local government. In 2004, the service sector accounted for 35% of local employment. Education in particular is well represented, with four institutions of higher learning nearby: the University of California, Santa Barbara, Santa Barbara City College, Westmont College, and Antioch University. The city is served by Santa Barbara Airport and train service is provided by Amtrak, which operates the Pacific Surfliner, which runs from San Diego to San Luis Obispo. The Santa Barbara area is connected via U.S. Highway 101 to Los Angeles  to the southeast and San Francisco  to the northwest. Behind the city, in and beyond the Santa Ynez Mountains, is the Los Padres National Forest, which contains several remote wilderness areas.

History

Evidence of human habitation of the area begins at least 13,000 years ago. Evidence for a Paleoindian presence includes a fluted Clovis-like point found in the 1980s along the western Santa Barbara County coast, as well as the remains of Arlington Springs Man, found on Santa Rosa Island in the 1960s.  At least 25,000 Chumash natives lived in the region prior to Spanish contact. Five Chumash villages flourished in the area. The present-day area of Santa Barbara City College was the village of Mispu; the site of the Los Baños pool (along west beach) was the village of Syukhtun, chief Yanonalit's large village located between Bath and Chapala streets; Amolomol was at the mouth of Mission Creek; and Swetete, above the bird refuge.

Spanish era

Spanish explorer Juan Rodríguez Cabrillo, sailing for the Kingdom of Spain, sailed through what is now called the Santa Barbara Channel in 1542, anchoring briefly in the area. In 1602, Spanish maritime explorer Sebastián Vizcaíno gave the name "Santa Barbara" to the channel and also to one of the Channel Islands.

A land expedition led by Gaspar de Portolà visited around 1769, and Franciscan missionary Juan Crespi, who accompanied the expedition, named a large native town "Laguna de la Concepcion". Cabrillo's earlier name, however, is the one that has survived.
 
The first permanent European residents were Spanish missionaries and soldiers under Felipe de Neve, who arrived in 1782 and constructed the Presidio. They were sent to both secure the Spanish claim to the region and to convert the indigenous peoples to Catholicism. Many of the Spaniards brought their families with them, and those formed the nucleus of the small town – at first just a cluster of adobes – that surrounded the Presidio of Santa Barbara. The Santa Barbara Mission was established on the Feast of Saint Barbara, December 4, 1786. It was the tenth of the California Missions to be founded by the Spanish Franciscans. It was dedicated by Padre Fermín Lasuén, who succeeded Padre Junipero Serra as the second president and founder of the California Franciscan Mission Chain. The Chumash laborers built a connection between the canyon creek and the Santa Barbara Mission water system through the use of a dam and an aqueduct. During the following decades, many of the natives died of diseases such as smallpox, against which they had no natural immunity.

The most dramatic event of the Spanish period was the powerful 1812 earthquake, and tsunami, with an estimated magnitude of 7.1, which destroyed the Mission as well as the rest of the town; water reached as high as present-day Anapamu street, and carried a ship half a mile up Refugio Canyon.  The Mission was rebuilt by 1820 after the earthquake. Following the earthquake, the Mission fathers chose to rebuild in a grander manner, and it is this construction that survives to the present day, the best-preserved of the California Missions, and still functioning as an active church by the Franciscans.  After the Mexican government secularized the missions in the 1830s, the baptismal, marriage, and burial records of other missions were transferred to Santa Barbara, and now found in the Santa Barbara Mission Archive-Library.

The Spanish period ended in 1822 with the conclusion of the Mexican War of Independence, which terminated 300 years of Spanish colonial rule and transferred control to the newly independent Mexican government.

Santa Barbara street names reflect the influence of the Spanish period. The names de le Guerra and Carrillo come from the Guerra family of California and Carrillo family of California. They were instrumental in building up the town, so they were honored by having streets named after them.

Mexican era
After the forced secularization of the Missions in 1833, successive Mexican Governors distributed the large land tracts formerly held by the Franciscan Order to various families in order to reward service or build alliances. These land grants to local notable families mark the beginning of the "Rancho Period" in California and Santa Barbara history. Fernando Tico was one of the first settlers who received land grants for the local area. Fernando led the Native Americans against the Argentinian pirates in the 1800s. The population remained sparse, with enormous cattle operations run by wealthy families. It was during this period that Richard Henry Dana, Jr. first visited Santa Barbara and wrote about the culture and people of Santa Barbara in his book Two Years Before the Mast.

Santa Barbara fell bloodlessly to a battalion of American soldiers under John C. Frémont on December 27, 1846, during the Mexican–American War, and after the Treaty of Guadalupe Hidalgo in 1848 it became part of the expanding United States.

Post-Conquest era

Change came quickly in Santa Barbara following the American Conquest of California. The population doubled between 1850 and 1860. In 1851, land surveyor Salisbury Haley designed the street grid, famously botching the block measurements, misaligning the streets, thereby creating doglegs at certain intersections.  Wood construction replaced adobe as American settlers moved in; during the Gold Rush years and following, the town became a haven for bandits and gamblers, and a dangerous and lawless place. Charismatic gambler and highwayman Jack Powers had virtual control of the town in the early 1850s, until driven out by a posse organized in San Luis Obispo. English gradually supplanted Spanish as the language of daily life, becoming the language of official record in 1870.  The first newspaper, the Santa Barbara Gazette, was founded in 1855.

While the Civil War had little effect on Santa Barbara, the disastrous drought of 1863 ended the Rancho Period, as most of the cattle died and ranchos were broken up and sold. Mortimer Cook, a wealthy entrepreneur, arrived in 1871 and opened the city's first bank. Cook later served two terms as mayor. Cook founded the first National Gold Bank of Santa Barbara in 1873. The building of Stearns Wharf in 1872 enhanced Santa Barbara's commercial and tourist accessibility; previously goods and visitors had to transfer from steamboats to smaller craft to row ashore. During the 1870s, writer Charles Nordhoff promoted the town as a health resort and destination for well-to-do travelers from other parts of the U.S.; many of them came, and many stayed. The luxurious Arlington Hotel dated from this period. In 1887 the railroad finally went through to Los Angeles, and in 1901 to San Francisco: Santa Barbara was now easily accessible by land and by sea, and subsequent development was brisk. Santa Barbara had a system of street railways that operated from 1875 through 1929. Begun as a single mule-drawn line from the waterfront pier to the Arlington Hotel, over the decades it was incrementally expanded, later electrified, and operated until its closure in June 1929.

Peter J. Barber, an architect, designed many Late Victorian style residences, and served twice as mayor, in 1880 and again in 1890. A year after Barber's term as mayor, President Benjamin Harrison became the first of five presidents to visit Santa Barbara.

Early 20th century to World War II

Just before the turn of the 20th century, oil was discovered at the Summerland Oil Field, and the region along the beach east of Santa Barbara sprouted numerous oil derricks and piers for drilling offshore. This was the first offshore oil development in the world; oil drilling offshore would become a contentious practice in the Santa Barbara area, which continues to the present day.

Santa Barbara housed the world's largest movie studio during the era of silent film. Flying A Studios, a division of the American Film Manufacturing Company, operated on two city blocks centered at State and Mission between 1910 and 1922, with the industry shutting down locally and moving to Hollywood once it outgrew the area, needing the resources of a larger city. Flying A and the other smaller local studios produced approximately 1,200 films during their tenure in Santa Barbara, of which approximately 100 survive.

During this period, the Loughead Aircraft Company was established on lower State Street, and regularly tested seaplanes off of East Beach. This was the genesis of what would later become Lockheed.

The magnitude 6.3 earthquake of June 29, 1925, the first destructive earthquake in California since the 1906 San Francisco quake, destroyed much of downtown Santa Barbara and killed 13 people. The earthquake caused infrastructure to collapse including the Sheffield Dam. The low death toll is attributed to the early hour (6:44 a.m., before most people were out on the streets, vulnerable to falling masonry). While this quake, like the one in 1812, was centered in the Santa Barbara Channel, it caused no tsunami. It came at an opportune time for rebuilding, since a movement for architectural reform and unification around a Spanish Colonial style was already underway. Under the leadership of Pearl Chase, many of the city's famous buildings rose as part of the rebuilding process, including the Santa Barbara County Courthouse, sometimes praised as the "most beautiful public building in the United States." In 1907 in northern Santa Barbara county a horrific train accident claimed the lives of 37, the exact cause of which is still unknown. It is still the deadliest disaster in the Santa Barbara history.

During World War II, Santa Barbara was home to Marine Corps Air Station Santa Barbara, and Naval Reserve Center Santa Barbara at the harbor. Up the coast, west of the city, was the Army's Camp Cooke (the present-day Vandenberg Space Force Base). In the city,
Hoff General Hospital treated servicemen wounded in the Pacific Theatre. Many Santa Barbara residents fled, and land values plummeted to historic lows.

After World War II

After the war many of the servicemen who had seen Santa Barbara returned to stay. The population surged by 10,000 people between the end of the war and 1950.  This burst of growth had dramatic consequences for the local economy and infrastructure. Highway 101 was built through town during this period, and newly built Lake Cachuma began supplying water via a tunnel dug through the mountains between 1950 and 1956.

Local relations with the oil industry gradually soured through the period. Production at Summerland had ended, Elwood was winding down, and to find new fields oil companies carried out seismic exploration of the Channel using explosives, a controversial practice that local fishermen claimed harmed their catch. The culminating disaster, and one of the formative events in the modern environmental movement, was the blowout at Union Oil's Platform A on the Dos Cuadras Field, about eight miles (13 km) southeast of Santa Barbara in the Santa Barbara Channel, on January 28, 1969. Approximately  of oil surged out of a huge undersea break, fouling hundreds of square miles of ocean and all the coastline from Ventura to Goleta, as well north facing beaches on the Channel Islands. Two legislative consequences of the spill in the next year were the passages of the California Environmental Quality Act (CEQA) and the National Environmental Policy Act (NEPA); locally, outraged citizens formed GOO (Get Oil Out).
Santa Barbara's business community strove to attract development until the surge in the anti-growth movement in the 1970s.  Many "clean" industries, especially aerospace firms such as Raytheon and Delco Electronics, moved to town in the 1950s and 1960s, bringing employees from other parts of the U.S. UCSB itself became a major employer.  In 1975, the city passed an ordinance restricting growth to a maximum of 85,000 residents, through zoning. Growth in the adjacent Goleta Valley could be shut down by denying water meters to developers seeking permits. As a result of these changes, growth slowed down, but prices rose sharply.

When voters approved connection to State water supplies in 1991, parts of the city, especially outlying areas, resumed growth, but more slowly than during the boom period of the 1950s and 1960s. While the slower growth preserved the quality of life for most residents and prevented the urban sprawl notorious in the Los Angeles basin, housing in the Santa Barbara area was in short supply, and prices soared: in 2006, only six percent of residents could afford a median-value house. As a result, many people who work in Santa Barbara commute from adjacent, more affordable areas, such as Santa Maria, Lompoc, and Ventura. The resultant traffic on incoming arteries, in particular the stretch of Highway 101 between Ventura and Santa Barbara, is another problem being addressed by long-range planners.

Notable wildfires
Since the middle of the twentieth century, several destructive fires have affected Santa Barbara: the 1964 Coyote Fire, which burned  of backcountry along with 106 homes; the smaller, but quickly moving, Sycamore Fire in 1977, which burned 200 homes; the disastrous 1990 Painted Cave Fire, which incinerated over 500 homes in only several hours, during an intense Sundowner wind event; the November 2008 Tea Fire, which destroyed 210 homes in the foothills of Santa Barbara and Montecito; and the 2009 Jesusita Fire that burned  and destroyed 160 homes above the San Roque region of Santa Barbara.

The Thomas Fire burned from its origins in Santa Paula  to the east of Santa Barbara and consumed  in Santa Barbara and Ventura counties, most of which consisted of rural land and wilderness areas. The fire started December 4, 2017, and was 100% contained by January 12, 2018. 1,050 structures were lost in the Thomas Fire, mostly east of Santa Barbara in Ventura County. The Thomas Fire has been the largest Santa Barbara County fire ever recorded to date.

Geography

This stretch of coast along southern Santa Barbara County is sometimes referred to as "The American Riviera", presumably because its geography and climate are similar to that of areas along the northern Mediterranean Sea coast (especially in southern France) known as the Riviera. The Santa Ynez Mountains, an east–west trending range, rise dramatically behind the city, with several peaks exceeding . Covered with chaparral, oaks and sandstone outcrops, they make a scenic backdrop to the town. Sometimes, perhaps once every three years, snow falls on the mountains, but it rarely stays for more than a few days. Nearer to town, directly east and adjacent to Mission Santa Barbara, is an east–west ridge known locally as "the Riviera," traversed by a road called "Alameda Padre Serra" (shortened APS, which translates to "Father Serra's pathway").

The high official figures for water is due to the extension of the city limit into the ocean, including a strip of city reaching out into the sea and inland again to keep the Santa Barbara Airport (SBA) within the city boundary.

Climate

Santa Barbara experiences a warm-summer Mediterranean climate (Köppen: Csb) characteristic of coastal California. Santa Barbara's weather was ranked number 1 in the United States in 2018 by U.S. News & World Report. Because the city lies along the ocean and parallel to the predominant westerly winds, sideshore and light onshore breezes moderate temperatures resulting in warmer winters and cooler summers compared with places farther inland.

In the winter, storms reach California, some of which bring heavy rainfall but the rainshadow effect of the coastal mountains can at times moderate or enhance the rainfall depending on local storm wind flows. Local rainfall totals can be enhanced by orographic lift when storms are accompanied by southerly flow pushing moist air over the Santa Ynez mountains, producing greater rainfall than in other coastal areas. Diurnal temperature variation reaches a maximum in winter due to lower humidity and the absence of summer fog. On average, only 1.7 nights have freezing lows.

Summers in Santa Barbara are mostly rainless due to the presence of a high-pressure area over the eastern Pacific, but summer showers can happen due to tropical hurricane/Monsoonal flows that rarely reach the region; thunderstorms can also occur during the North American Monsoon. In the fall, afternoon or evening downslope winds, locally called "Sundowners", can raise temperatures into the high 90s °F (high 30s °C) and drop humidities into the single digits, increasing the chance due to downed power lines, etc., and severity of wildfires in the foothills north of the city.

Snow sometimes covers higher elevations of the Santa Ynez Mountains but is extremely rare in the city itself. The most recent accumulating snow to fall near sea level was in January 1949, when approximately  fell in the city.

Geology and soils

The city of Santa Barbara is situated on a coastal plain between the Santa Ynez Mountains and the sea. This coastal plain consists of a complex array of Holocene and Pleistocene alluvial and colluvial deposits, marine terraces, debris flows, and estuarine deposits.  Soils are mostly well drained brown fine sandy loam of the Milpitas series.  Rapid geologic uplift is characteristic of the entire region, as evidenced by the coastal bluffs and narrow beaches that are present along most of the coastline.

Downtown Santa Barbara occupies a floodplain between two major geologic faults, the Mission Ridge Fault Zone to the north and the Mesa Fault to the south. The Mission Ridge Fault Zone runs along the range of hills known locally as the "Riviera", and the Mesa Fault defines the northern boundary of the band of hills called the "Mesa". These two faults converge near the Five Points Shopping Center at Los Positas and State Streets. Neither is well-exposed, with their locations being inferred from topography, springs, seeps, and well logs.  The Mesa Fault continues southeast offshore into the Santa Barbara Channel; the portion of the fault offshore is believed to have been responsible for the destructive earthquake of 1925. The Mission Ridge Fault trends east–west, being named the More Ranch Fault west of Santa Barbara, and forms the northern boundary of the uplands which include Isla Vista, More Mesa, and the Hope Ranch Hills.

Three major sedimentary bedrock units underlie the coastal plain: the Monterey Formation, the Sisquoc Formation, and the Santa Barbara Formation.  The Santa Barbara Formation is one of the main units in the aquifer underlying the city. Its coarse-grained freshwater-bearing portion, much of which is below sea level, is protected from seawater intrusion by the More Ranch Fault, which has shielded it by uplifting less-permeable rocks between it and the sea. The majority of water wells in the Santa Barbara-Goleta area pull from this geologic unit.

The Santa Ynez Mountains to the north of the city consist of multiple layers of sandstone and conglomerate units dating from the Jurassic Age to the present, uplifted rapidly since the Pliocene, upended, and in some areas completely overturned. Rapid uplift has given these mountains their craggy, scenic character, and numerous landslides and debris flows, which form some of the urban and suburban lowland area, are testament to their geologically active nature.

Architecture

The first Monterey-style adobe in California was built on State Street of Santa Barbara by the wealthy merchant Alpheus Thompson. The dominant architectural themes of Santa Barbara are the Mediterranean Revival, Spanish Colonial Revival and the related Mission Revival style, encouraged through design guidelines adopted by city leaders after the 1925 earthquake destroyed much of the downtown commercial district. Residential architectural styles in Santa Barbara reflect the era of their construction. Many late-1800s Victorian homes remain downtown and in the "Upper East" neighborhood. California bungalows are common, built in the early decades of the 20th century. Spanish Colonial Revival-style homes built after 1925 are common all over the city, especially in newer upscale residential areas like Montecito and Hope Ranch. Notable modernist and contemporary homes can be found as well.

Notable architects who practiced in Santa Barbara include: 
 Peter J. Barber (1830–1905)
 James Osborne Craig (died 1922)
 Mary Craig (1889–1964)
 Reginald Davis Johnson (1882–1952)
 Harriet Moody (1891–1966)
 John Frederic Murphy (1887–1957)
 Thomas Nixon (died 1919) 
 Edwards and Plunkett (active 1925 to 1940) 
 Lutah Maria Riggs (1896–1984)
 Winsor Soule (1883–1954)
 Francis Townsend Underhill (1863–1929)
 Francis W. Wilson (1870–1947)
 Carleton Winslow (1876–1946)
 George Washington Smith (1876–1930)

Neighborhoods
Santa Barbara has a range of neighborhoods with distinctive histories, architecture, and culture. While considerable consensus exists as to the identification of neighborhood names and boundaries, variations exist between observers. For example, real estate agents may use different names than those used by public utilities or municipal service providers, such as police, fire, or water services. The following is a list of neighborhoods with descriptions and comments on each.

 The Mesa stretches  from Santa Barbara City College on the east to Arroyo Burro County Beach (or "Hendry's/The Pit" to locals) on the west. "The Mesa" embodies a beach vibe. The neighborhood has beach access to Mesa Lane Beach, as well as Thousand Steps Beach. This is considered to be a desirable neighborhood due to its proximity to the ocean as well as the college. Residential development began here in the 1920s but was interrupted by the discovery of the Mesa Oil Field. The field was quickly exhausted, and after the Second World War building of houses resumed, although the last oil tanks and sumps did not disappear until the early 1970s.
 Bel Air and Alta Mesa comprise most of the coastal highlands of Santa Barbara, north (landward) of the Mesa.  The area is almost entirely residential except for the Honda Valley natural area and Elings Park, the largest privately funded park in the United States.  Several homes on the northeast slopes and crests have views of downtown Santa Barbara, the Riviera, the Santa Ynez Mountains, and the coast to Ventura and beyond, while many on the southern side have views of the Santa Barbara Channel and Channel Islands National Park.  Due to its position along Santa Barbara County's east–west-trending southern coastline, fall and winter sunrises occur above the ocean here, a rarity on the Pacific coast of the United States.
 Mission Canyon contains the wooded hilly area beginning at the Old Mission and extending along Foothill Road, north and east into Mission Canyon Road and Las Canoas Road. A popular spot as an entry-point for weekend foothill hiking, it is one of the most rustically beautiful, yet fire-prone areas of Santa Barbara due to heavy natural vegetation.
 The Riviera encompasses an ocean-facing hillside and back hillside extending for approximately two miles, with the north side extending from Foothill Road to Sycamore Canyon Road, and the south side from the Santa Barbara Mission to North Salinas Street. The ribbon-like Alameda Padre Serra serves as the principal entry point from the Mission and the City of Santa Barbara. Since the past century, it has been known as "the Riviera" due to its resemblance to the Mediterranean coastal towns of France and Italy. The neighborhood has winding streets with intricate stonework terracing built by early 20th-century Italian immigrants. Most of the topography of the Riviera is relatively steep, making it particularly noteworthy for homes with outstanding views of the City of Santa Barbara and the Pacific Ocean.
 The Westside ("west of State Street") lies predominantly in the lowlands between State Street and the Mesa, including Highway 101, and also reaches down to Cliff Drive, incorporating Santa Barbara City College.
 The Eastside ("east of State Street") is generally the area east of State to the base of the Riviera, and includes Santa Barbara Junior High School, Santa Barbara High School, and the Santa Barbara Bowl.
 The Waterfront comprises roughly commercial and tourist-oriented business structures along Cabrillo Boulevard including Stearns Wharf, the Santa Barbara Harbor and the breakwater, and extending east toward the Bird Refuge and west along Shoreline Drive above the SBCC campus West.
 Upper State Street is a residential and commercial district that includes numerous professional offices, and much of the medical infrastructure of the city. Upper State is generally defined by the location of the Granada Theatre and points Northwest. Upper State includes the Santa Barbara Mission and the late Pearl Chase's influence on home design is ever-present in this area.
 San Roque is located northwest of the downtown area and north of Samarkand. This area is said to be a constant 5 degrees warmer than the coastal areas, due to its greater distance from the ocean than other Santa Barbara neighborhoods, and being separated from the sea by a low range of hills to the south of the 101 freeway, occupied by the Mesa and Hope Ranch. San Roque area weather is considered by locals as the most temperate of all Santa Barbara Cities areas.
The name Samarkand comes from an Old Persian word meaning "the land of heart's desire." It was first applied to a deluxe Persian-style hotel that was converted from a boys' school in 1920. Samarkand later became identified as its own neighborhood located between Las Positas, State Street, De La Vina, Oak Park, and the Freeway. Earle Ovington built the first home here in 1920 at 3030 Samarkand Drive. As a pilot, Ovington established the Casa Loma Air Field with a  runway that was used by legendary pilots Lindbergh and Earhart.

Demographics

2010

The 2010 United States Census reported that Santa Barbara had a population of 88,665.

According to the 2010 United States Census the racial makeup of Santa Barbara was 66,411 (75.1%) White; 1,420 (1.6%) African American; 892 (1.0%) Native American; 3,062 (3.5%) Asian (1.0% Chinese, 0.6% Filipino, 0.5% Japanese, 0.4% Korean, 0.4% Indian, 0.2% Vietnamese, 0.4% other); 116 (0.1%) Pacific Islander; 13,032 (14.7%) from other races; 3,477 (3.9%) from two or more races.  Hispanics or Latinos of any race were 33,591 persons (38.0%). Non-Hispanic Whites were 45,852 persons (52.2%)

The Census reported that 86,783 people (98.2% of the population) lived in households, 1,172 (1.3%) lived in non-institutionalized group quarters, and 455 (0.5%) were institutionalized.

Of the 35,449 households, 8,768 (24.7%) had children under the age of 18 living in them, 13,240 (37.3%) were opposite-sex married couples living together, 3,454 (9.7%) had a female householder with no husband present, and 1,539 (4.3%) had a male householder with no wife present. There were 2,420 (6.8%) unmarried opposite-sex partnerships, and 339 (1.0%) same-sex married couples or partnerships; 11,937 households (33.7%) were made up of individuals, and 4,340 (12.2%) had someone living alone who was 65 years of age or older. The average household size was 2.45. There were 18,233 families (51.4% of all households); the average family size was 3.13.

The population was spread out, with 16,468 people (18.6%) under the age of 18, 10,823 people (12.2%) aged 18 to 24, 26,241 people (29.7%) aged 25 to 44, 22,305 people (25.2%) aged 45 to 64, and 12,573 people (14.2%) who were 65 years of age or older. The median age was 36.8 years. For every 100 females, there were 98.5 males.  For every 100 females age 18 and over, there were 97.7 males.

The homeowner vacancy rate was 1.3%; the rental vacancy rate was 4.1%; 34,056 people (38.5% of the population) lived in owner-occupied housing units and 52,727 people (59.6%) lived in rental housing units.

2000
As of the census of 2000, 92,325 people*, 35,605 households, and 18,941 families resided in the city. The racial makeup of the city was 74.0% White, 1.8% African American, 1.1% Native American, 2.8% Asian, 0.1% Pacific Islander, 16.4% from other races, and 3.9% from two or more races. People of Hispanic or Latino background, of any race, were 35.0% of the population.

Of the 35,605 households, 24.3% had children under the age of 18 living with them, 39.8% were married couples living together, 9.5% had a female householder with no husband present, and 46.8% were not families. About 32.9% of all households were made up of individuals, and 11.4% had someone living alone who was 65 years of age or older. The average household size was 2.47 and the average family size was 3.17.

In the city, the population was distributed as 19.8% under the age of 18, 13.8% from 18 to 24, 32.3% from 25 to 44, 20.4% from 45 to 64, and 13.8% who were 65 years of age or older. The median age was 35 years. For every 100 females, there were 97.0 males. For every 100 females age 18 and over, there were 95.0 males.

The median income for a household in the city was $47,498, and for a family was $57,880. Males had a median income of $37,116 versus $31,911 for females. The per capita income for the city was $26,466. About 7.7% of families and 13.4% of the population were below the poverty line, including 16.8% of those under age 18 and 7.4% of those age 65 or over. If one compares the per capita income to the actual cost of living, the number of people living below the poverty line is considerably higher.

Economy
Aerospace and defense companies such as Alliant Techsystems, Channel Technologies Group, FLIR Systems, and Raytheon have major operations in the area. As a tourist destination, the hospitality industry has a significant presence in the regional economy. Among notable business ventures and innovations, Motel 6 was started in Santa Barbara in 1962. The Egg McMuffin was invented by Herb Peterson at the upper State Street McDonald's. The Habit Burger Grill restaurant chain began in Old Town Goleta. Kinko's (now owned by FedEx and known as FedEx Office) was founded by Paul Orfalea Isla Vista, near UC Santa Barbara, in 1970.

, southern Santa Barbara County employed more than half the county's total workers. The County's largest employers are:

Other major employers include Mission Linen Supply, Jordano's, Marborg Industries, the Santa Barbara Biltmore and San Ysidro Ranch, Westmont College, Mentor, CJ Affiliate, Beachfront Hilton Resort, Belmond El Encanto and QAD.

Retail centers include the traditional downtown area along lower State Street, where the Paseo Nuevo shopping center is located, and La Cumbre Plaza on upper State Street.

Arts and culture

Performing arts
Santa Barbara contains numerous performing art venues, including the 2,000 seat Arlington Theatre, which is the largest indoor performance venue in Santa Barbara and site of the annual Santa Barbara International Film Festival. Other major venues include the Lobero Theatre, a historic building and favorite venue for small concerts; the Granada Theater, the tallest building downtown, originally built by contractor C.B. Urton in 1924, but with the theatre remodeled and reopened in March 2008; and the Santa Barbara Bowl, a 4,562 seat outdoor amphitheater in a canyon at the base of the Riviera.

The city is considered a haven for classical music lovers with a symphony orchestra, a professional opera company, and many non-profit classical music groups (such as CAMA). Several youth orchestras are also located in Santa Barbara, such as Santa Barbara Strings. The Music Academy of the West, located in Montecito, hosts an annual music festival in the summer, drawing renowned students and professionals.

Tourist attractions

Santa Barbara is a year-round tourist destination renowned for its fair weather, downtown beaches, and Spanish architecture.  Tourism brings more than one billion dollars per year into the local economy, including $80 million in tax revenue. Mission Santa Barbara, "The Queen of the Missions," is located on a rise about two miles (3 km) inland from the harbor, and is an active Franciscan mission and place of worship, sightseeing stop, and national historic landmark. Annually over the Memorial Day weekend, there is a chalk-art festival known as I Madonnari, with ephemeral works of art created on the asphalt in front of the mission, and food stalls set up and music.

The Santa Barbara County Courthouse, a red tiled Spanish-Moorish structure, provides a view of the downtown area from its open air tower. The Presidio of Santa Barbara, a Spanish military installation and chapel built in 1782, was central to the town's early development and colonial roots. In 1855, the Presidio Chapel, being in decay, grew into the Apostolic College of Our Lady of Sorrows, now Our Lady of Sorrows Church.

The annual Fiesta (originally called "Old Spanish Days") is celebrated every year in August. The Fiesta is hosted by the Native Daughters of the Golden West and the Native Sons of the Golden West in a joint committee called the Fiesta Board. Fiesta was originally started as a tourist attraction, like the Rose Bowl, to draw business into the town in the 1920s. Flower Girls and Las Señoritas march and participate in both Fiesta Pequeña (the kickoff of Fiesta) and the various parades. Flower Girls is for girls under 13. They throw roses and other flowers into the crowds. Las Señoritas are their older escorts. Many Señoritas join the Native Daughters at the age of 16.

The annual Santa Barbara French Festival takes place on Bastille Day weekend in July and is the largest French Festival in the western United States.

New Noise Music Conference and Festival, established in 2009, is a four-day event with the main party in the Funk Zone, a small art and wine tasting section of the city near the beach, and other small bands to local venues around the city. New Noise brings in over 75 bands and 50 speakers to the festival each year.

For over 40 years, the Santa Barbara Arts and Crafts Show has been held on Cabrillo Boulevard, east of Stearns Wharf and along the beach, attracting thousands of people to see artwork made by artists and crafts people that live in Santa Barbara county. By the rules of the show, all the works displayed must have been made by the artists and craftspeople themselves, who sell their own goods. The show started in the early 1960s, and now has over 200 booths on Sundays. The show is also held on some Saturdays that are national holidays, but not during inclement weather.

The Santa Barbara International Film Festival, another local non-profit, draws over 50,000 attendees during what is usually Santa Barbara's slow season in late January. SBIFF hosts a wide variety of celebrities, premieres, panels and movies from around the world and runs for 10 days.

The annual Summer Solstice Parade draws up to 100,000 people. It is a colorful themed parade put on by local residents, and follows a route along State Street for approximately one mile, ending at Alameda Park. Its main rule is that no written messages or banners with words are allowed. Floats and costumes vary from the whimsical to the outrageous; parties and street events take place throughout the weekend of the parade, the first weekend after the solstice.

Surfing is a part of Santa Barbara culture. The late Bruce Brown's cult classic documentary, The Endless Summer, put surfing on the map, and he was often seen around town prior to his passing in December 2017. Surfing legend Pat Curren and his son, three time world champion Tom Curren, as well as ten time world champion Kelly Slater, and other popular surfers such as Shaun Tompson, Jack Johnson and Chris Brown call Santa Barbara home. The Channel Islands block summer surf swells that come from the tropics or further south, the southern hemisphere. For these reasons Santa Barbara is viewed as a winter surf location.

Other tourist-centered attractions include:

Stearns Wharf – Adjacent to Santa Barbara Harbor, features shops, several restaurants, and the newly rebuilt Ty Warner Sea Center and Lower State Street.
Rafael Gonzalez House – Adobe residence of the alcalde of Santa Barbara in the 1820s, and a National Historic Landmark.
Burton Mound – on Mason Street at Burton Circle, this mound is thought to be the Chumash village of Syujton, recorded by Juan Rodríguez Cabrillo in 1542, and again by Fr. Crespí and Portolá in 1769. (California Historical Landmark No. 306)
De La Guerra Plaza (Casa de la Guerra) – Site of the first City Hall, and still the center of the city's administration.  (California Historical Landmark No. 307)  Also the location of the Santa Barbara News-Press.
Covarrubias Adobe – Built in 1817; adjacent to the Santa Barbara Historical Museum on Santa Barbara Street. (California Historical Landmark No. 308)
Hastings Adobe – Built in 1854, partially from material recovered from the wreck of the S.S. Winfield Scott. (California Historical Landmark No. 559)
Hill-Carrillo Adobe – Built in 1825 by Daniel A. Hill for his wife Rafaela L. Ortega y Olivera; currently at 11 E. Carrillo Street.
Cold Spring Tavern
Santa Barbara Zoo
Channel Islands National Marine Sanctuary
Channel Islands National Park
Rancho del Cielo

Museums

The Santa Barbara Museum of Art (SBMA), located on State Street, features nationally recognized collections and special exhibitions of international importance. Highlights of the Museum's permanent collection include antiquities; 19th-century French, British, and American art; 20th-century and contemporary European, North American, and Latin American art; Asian art; photography; and works on paper. It has an education program that serves local and surrounding communities through extensive on-site programming and curriculum resources.

Museum of Contemporary Art Santa Barbara (MCASB), located on the top floor of Paseo Nuevo shopping mall, is a non-profit, non-collecting museum dedicated to the exhibition, education, and cultivation of the arts of our time. It offers free admission to its exhibitions and public programming.

Other art venues include the University Art Museum on the University of California at Santa Barbara Campus, various private galleries, and a wide variety of art and photography shows. The Santa Barbara Museum of Natural History is located immediately behind the Santa Barbara Mission in a complex of Mission-style buildings set in a park-like campus. The Museum offers indoor and outdoor exhibits and a state-of-the-art planetarium.

The Santa Barbara Historical Museum is located on De La Guerra Street. The Santa Barbara Maritime Museum is located at 113 Harbor Way (the former Naval Reserve Center Santa Barbara) on the waterfront. The Karpeles Manuscript Library Museum (free admission) houses a collection of historical documents and manuscripts. Two open air museums here are Lotusland and Casa del Herrero, exemplifying the American Country Place era in Santa Barbara. Casa Dolores, center for the popular arts of Mexico, is devoted to the collection, preservation, study, and exhibition of an extensive variety of objects of the popular arts of Mexico.

The Reagan Ranch Center is a three-story museum and gallery operated by Young America's Foundation, next to the Amtrak Station on Lower State Street. Its focus is the history of the Rancho del Cielo and the role it played in Ronald Reagan's life.

Sports
Athletics teams wearing the UC Santa Barbara Gauchos uniform are some of the most popular spectator sports locally. The Gauchos field 20 varsity teams in NCAA Division I, most of which play in the Big West Conference. Popular teams include the men's soccer team, which averages over 3,800 fans per game, and the men's basketball team, which averages over 2,300 fans per game. 

Santa Barbara annually hosts the Semana Nautica Summer Sports Festival. One of the main events of the festival is the Semana Nautica 15K, the oldest continuously running race on California's central coast. Nite Moves is a popular local 5k race, with an optional ocean swim portion, open to all ages and held on Wednesday evenings from May to the end of August.

Parks and recreation

Santa Barbara has many parks, ranging from small spaces within the urban environment to large, semi-wilderness areas that remain within the city limits. Some notable parks within the city limits are as follows:
 Alameda Park
 Alice Keck Park Memorial Garden
 Andree Clark Bird Refuge
 Butterfly Beach
 De La Guerra Plaza
 Douglas Family Preserve
 East Beach
 Elings Park
 Franceschi Park
 Hendry's Beach (Arroyo Burro)
 Hilda Ray Park
 Leadbetter Beach
 Mission Historical Park
 Parma Park
 Shoreline Park
 Skofield Park
 West Beach

Some notable parks and open spaces just outside the city limits include:
 Chumash Painted Cave State Historic Park
 Gould Park
 Rattlesnake Canyon, a popular hiking area.
 Santa Barbara Botanic Garden, which contains a diverse collection of plants from around California; it is in Mission Canyon, directly north of the city.

In addition to these parks, there are other hiking trails in Santa Barbara. A 6–7 mile hike from Gaviota State Park traverses the mountains with an ocean view.

Government
In 2015, the city council voted to change from at-large elections to district elections for city council seats.

All of Santa Barbara County falls into California's 24th congressional district. The district leans towards the Democratic Party, with a PVI of D+10, making it politically aligned with the rest of California overall. The current Representative is Salud Carbajal.

Education

Colleges and universities

Santa Barbara and the immediately adjacent area is home to several colleges and universities:

Research university
 University of California, Santa Barbara

Liberal arts colleges
 Westmont College
 Antioch University

Community college
 Santa Barbara City College

Trade schools
 Santa Barbara Business College

Conservatory
 Music Academy of the West

Non-research graduate schools
 Pacifica Graduate Institute
 Fielding Graduate University
 Santa Barbara Graduate Institute
 Southern California Institute of Law
 Santa Barbara & Ventura Colleges of Law

High schools
Secondary and Primary School students go to the Santa Barbara and Hope district schools. There are also a variety of private schools in the area. The following schools are on the south coast of Santa Barbara County, including the cities of Santa Barbara, Goleta, Carpinteria, and contiguous unincorporated areas.

 The Anacapa School, 7–12
 San Marcos High School, 9–12
 Dos Pueblos High School, 9–12
 Dos Pueblos Continuation High School, 9–12
 Las Alturas Continuation High School, 9–12
 La Cuesta/Pathfinders Continuation High School, 9–12
 San Marcos Continuation High School, 9–12
 Santa Barbara High School, 9–12
 Laguna Blanca School K-12
 Bishop Garcia Diego High School, 9–12
 Cate School, 9–12
 Providence Santa Barbara, 9–12
Carpinteria High School, 9–12
Rincon/Foothill High School, 9–12 (CUSD)

Junior high/middle schools
 Carpinteria Middle School, 6–8 (CUSD)
 Community Day School, 7–8
 Crane Country Day School, K-8
 Goleta Valley Junior High School, 7–8
 La Colina Junior High School, 7–8
 La Cumbre Junior High School, 7–8
 Santa Barbara Junior High School, 7–8
 Santa Barbara Middle School, 6–9
 Santa Barbara Montessori School, Pre-K to 8
 Waldorf School of Santa Barbara, K-8

K-12
Providence Santa Barbara (formerly known as Santa Barbara Christian School K-8)

Media

Newspapers
Santa Barbara has two adjudicated, general circulation newspapers: 
 The daily Santa Barbara News-Press (sold to local resident Wendy P. McCaw by the New York Times Company in 2000), with a circulation of about 25,000,
 The Santa Barbara Independent, a weekly with 40,000 audited circulation.

There are also two online newspapers: 
 Noozhawk, an online newspaper founded by William MacFadyen in 2007. 
 Edhat, a privately owned community news site founded in 2003.

In addition, the business journal Pacific Coast Business Times covers Ventura, Santa Barbara, and San Luis Obispo counties.

Television 
The following TV stations broadcast in Santa Barbara Market Area:
 KEYT 3, an ABC/CBS television affiliate;
 K10PV-D 10, an NBC television affiliate; repeater of KSBY 6, broadcast from San Luis Obispo
 KCOY 12 a Dabl television affiliate; broadcast from Santa Maria
 KSBB-CD 17 a FOX television affiliate; license to Santa Barbara studios broadcast from KCOY in Santa Maria. Repeater of KKFX 24 San Luis Obispo Also seen on cable channel 11.  
 K26FT-D 26, a repeater for the secondary Los Angeles PBS member station KCET 
 KTAS 33, a Telemundo affiliate; broadcast from San Luis Obispo
 KPMR 38, a Univision affiliate, and
 KBAB-LD 50, a rebroadcast of the primary Los Angeles  PBS member station KOCE (licensed to Huntington Beach)
 TV Santa Barbara; Voice-17 (Public-access television) and Culture-71 Arts & Education (formerly owned by Cox Communications).

Radio
 KTMS (990 AM) News/Talk
 KZER (1250 AM) Regional Mexican
 KZSB (1290 AM) News/Talk
 KCLU (1340 AM) NPR"NPR for the California Coast" Rebroadcast of KCLU-FM Thousand Oaks
 KOSJ (1490 AM) Rhythmic Oldies
 KDRW (88.7 FM) NPR Rebroadcast KCRW 89.9 Santa Monica
 KSBX (89.5 FM) NPR Rebroadcast KCBX 90.1 FM San Luis Obispo
 KMRO (90.3 FM)  Spanish Christian Radio Nueva Vida
 KCSB (91.9 FM) (Freeform)  UCSB
 KJEE (92.9 FM)Alternative
 KDB (93.7 FM)Classical  (Rebroadcast of KUSC 91.5 FM Los Angeles)
 KSPE (94.5 FM) Regional Mexican
 KLOS (95.5 FM) Classic Rock broadcasting from Los Angeles
 KLSB (97.5 FM) Contemporary Christian K-LOVE
 KDAR (98.3 FM) Christian broadcasting from Oxnard
 KTYD (99.9 FM) Classic Rock
 KHAY (100.7 FM) Country broadcasting from Ventura
 KSBL (101.7 FM)Adult Contemporary which markets itself as KLITE and is owned by Rincon Broadcasting.
 KRUZ (103.3 FM) Classic Hits, formerly CHR-Rhythmic station KVYB.
 KRAZ (105.9 FM) Country
 KIST (107.7 FM) Regional Mexican

Some Los Angeles radio stations can be heard, although somewhat faintly due to the  distance. Santa Monica-based NPR radio station KCRW can be heard in Santa Barbara at 106.9 MHz, and San Luis Obispo-based NPR station KCBX at 89.5 FM and 90.9 FM. The California Lutheran University operated NPR station KCLU (102.3 FM, 1340 AM) based in Thousand Oaks in Ventura County also serves Santa Barbara and has reporters covering the city. The only non-commercial radio station based in Santa Barbara is KCSB-FM (91.9 FM), owned by the University of California, Santa Barbara, which uses it as part of its educational mission.

Transportation

Santa Barbara is bisected by U.S. Route 101, an automotive transportation corridor that links the city to the rest of the Central Coast region, San Francisco to the north, and Los Angeles to the southeast. Santa Barbara Municipal Airport offers commercial air service. Santa Barbara Aviation provides locally based private jet charter aircraft. Amtrak offers rail service through the Coast Starlight and Pacific Surfliner trains at the Santa Barbara station on State Street, and another stop at Goleta Station.

The Santa Barbara Metropolitan Transit District (MTD) provides local bus service across the city.  Greyhound bus lines provide service to downtown Santa Barbara. Electric shuttles operated by MTD ferry tourists and shoppers up and down lower State Street and to the wharf. The Clean Air Express bus offers connections to Lompoc and Santa Maria.  Ventura Intercity Service Transit Authority (VISTA) bus service offers connections south to Ventura and west to Goleta. Santa Barbara Airbus offers daily service to/from LAX from downtown Santa Barbara, Carpinteria and Goleta.

Santa Barbara has an extensive network of bike trails and other resources for cyclists, and the League of American Bicyclists recognizes Santa Barbara as a Silver Level city. Santa Barbara Car Free promotes visiting and exploring the area without use of a car.

Often chosen as a winter training location for professional cycling teams and snowbirds, Santa Barbara has cycling routes and several climbs, including Gibraltar Road and Old San Marcos/Painted Cave. A bike path and route connects the University of California, Santa Barbara to the downtown area, passing through Goleta and Hope Ranch. Bike rentals are a way for tourists to view Santa Barbara and the surrounding area. In 2009, the Santa Barbara-Santa Maria-Goleta metropolitan statistical area (MSA) ranked as the sixth highest in the United States for percentage of commuters who biked to work (4 percent).

From 1875 until 1929, a tramway existed in Santa Barbara.

Sister cities
Santa Barbara's sister cities are:

 Kotor, Kotor Municipality, Montenegro (2009)
 Patras, Western Greece, Greece (2010)
 Puerto Vallarta, Jalisco,  Mexico (1973)
 Toba, Mie, Japan (1966)
 Weihai, Shandong,  China (1993)
In 2023, the relationship with San Juan, Metro Manila, Philippines was ended. In 2020, Santa Barbara ceased being sister cities with Dingle, Ireland. In 2006, Santa Barbara ceased being sister cities with Yalta, Crimea.

In popular culture

Several films have been fully or partially set in Santa Barbara, including:

 What Price Hollywood?, a 1932 pre-Code Hollywood drama
 Steal Big Steal Little, a 1995 American drama
 A Date with Judy, a 1948 MGM musical film
 The Graduate, a 1967 American romantic comedy-drama 
 The Gumball Rally, a 1976 American comedy
 Cutter's Way, a 1981 American neo-noir thriller
 Demolition Man, a 1993 American science fiction action film
 Steal Big Steal Little, a 1995 American comedy
 My Favorite Martian, a 1999 American science fiction comedy film, which was filmed on location 
 Cruel Intentions 3, a 2004 direct-to-video teen drama film
 Alpha Dog, 2006, an American crime drama based on the true story of the kidnapping and murder of Nicholas Markowitz at the hands of Jesse James Hollywood.
 It's Complicated, a 2009 American romantic comedy
 Santa Barbara, a 2014 South Korean romance
 20th Century Women, a 2016 American comedy-drama 
 Psych 2: Lassie Come Home, a 2020 American made-for-television comedy

Psych was set in Santa Barbara, though White Rock, British Columbia, Canada, was used as the filming location.

Santa Barbara, the popular soap opera set locally, aired on NBC from 1984 to 1993.

The TV series Owen Marshall, Counselor at Law was set in Santa Barbara.

An American Family, which is known as the first American reality television show, chronicled the daily lives of a family living in Santa Barbara.

A portion of the 2020 video game The Last of Us II takes place in Santa Barbara.

In 2022, shooting began on season 4 of the reality TV series Love Island, which is set at Dos Pueblos Ranch, a 214-acre ranch west of Goleta.

Notable people

See also

City of Santa Barbara Historic Landmarks
List of mayors of Santa Barbara, California
Santa Barbara City Fire Department
USNS Mission Santa Barbara (T-AO-131)
USS Santa Barbara

Notes

Further reading
 Baker, Gayle. Santa Barbara. Harbor Town Histories, Santa Barbara. 2003. ISBN (print) 0-9710984-1-7 (e-book) 978-0-9879038-1-5
 Birchard, Robert S. Silent-Era Filmmaking in Santa Barbara. Arcadia Publishing. 2007. 
 Graham, Otis L.; Bauman, Robert; Dodd, Douglas W.; Geraci, Victor W.; Murray, Fermina Brel. Stearns Wharf: Surviving Change on the California Coast.  Graduate Program in Public Historical Studies, University of California, 1994. 
 Tompkins, Walker A. Santa Barbara, Past and Present. Tecolote Books, Santa Barbara, CA, 1975.
 Tompkins, Walker A. It Happened in Old Santa Barbara. Sandollar Press, Santa Barbara, CA, 1976.
 Tompkins, Walker A. Santa Barbara History Makers. McNally & Loftin, Santa Barbara. 1983.

External links

 
 Santa Barbara on city-data.com
 Santa Barbara Conference & Visitors Bureau and Film Commission
 City of Santa Barbara TV Live Stream
 National Register of Historic Places listings
 Santa Barbara Views, ca. 1875, The Bancroft Library
 

 
1850 establishments in California
Articles containing video clips
Cities in Santa Barbara County, California
County seats in California
Incorporated cities and towns in California
Populated coastal places in California
Populated places established in 1850
Port cities in California
Spanish mission settlements in North America